Max Sebastian Doerner (1889-1967) was an early rugby league footballer in the  New South Wales Rugby League competition in the 1910s.

Max Doerner played with Glebe for two seasons between 1915-1916 and Eastern Suburbs in the 1917 season. He is listed on the Sydney Roosters Players register as player No.91.

He died on 3 May 1967.

References

The Eastern Suburbs website

Australian rugby league players
Sydney Roosters players
1889 births
1967 deaths
Place of birth missing